"Go Your Own Way" is a song by British-American rock band Fleetwood Mac from their eleventh studio album, Rumours (1977). The song was released as the album's first single in December 1976 on both sides of the Atlantic. Written and sung by Lindsey Buckingham, it became the band's first top-ten hit in the United States. "Go Your Own Way" has been well received by music critics and was ranked number 120 by Rolling Stone magazine on their list of 500 greatest songs of all time in 2010, and re-ranked number 401 in 2021. They also ranked the song second on their list of the 50 greatest Fleetwood Mac songs.

Recorded in three separate studios, the track was developed over a period of four months. As with most tracks on the Rumours album, none of the instruments was recorded live together; the tracks were instead completed through a series of overdubs. Lyrically, "Go Your Own Way" is about Buckingham's breakup with bandmate and former lover Stevie Nicks.

Composition

"Go Your Own Way" was written at a house the band rented in Florida between legs of their Fleetwood Mac Tour. Mick Fleetwood, the band's drummer, remembered that the house had a "distinctly bad vibe to it, as if it were haunted, which did nothing to help matters…". For the first song Buckingham wrote for Rumours, Buckingham picked up an electric guitar and chugged the chord progression. In what he described as "a stream of consciousness", he sang the opening line, "Loving you isn't the right thing to do". By 1976 the romantic relationship between Stevie Nicks and Lindsey Buckingham had come to an end. While Buckingham and Nicks were still on speaking terms, their conversations often devolved into yelling and screaming matches.

Inspired by the drum feel of "Street Fighting Man" by The Rolling Stones, Buckingham sought to incorporate a variation of the groove in "Go Your Own Way". On "Street Fighting Man", the drumbeat alternates between the tom-tom and the snare drum, which Buckingham wanted Fleetwood to play on "Go Your Own Way"'s verses. Ken Caillat, Fleetwood Mac's producer, took notice of Buckingham's enthusiasm as he demonstrated the drum part he envisioned to Fleetwood. "I remember watching him guide Mick (Fleetwood) as to what he wanted – he'd be so animated, like a little kid, playing these air tom fills with his curly hair flying. Mick wasn't so sure he could do what Lindsey wanted, but he did a great job, and the song took off." Fleetwood would ultimately come up with his own variation of the "Street Fighting Man" groove, where he played across the tom-toms while letting the bass drum play the middle beat.

Initially, John McVie tracked a busier, and bouncier bass part that gave the song "a country feel". To prevent the verses from becoming too bloated, Buckingham asked him to straight eighth notes along with the rhythm guitar. Buckingham granted McVie more artistic liberty on the choruses, which he opened up with a more melodic bass line. Additional overdubs of Hammond B3 organ, electric and acoustic guitars, layered backing vocals, and assorted percussion such as the bell of a cymbal and maracas were also added to the mix. The song follows an aeolian I-VI-VII descending chord progression.

The band had a difficult time assembling a suitable guitar solo, so Caillat, who was away in Lake Tahoe for Christmas vacation, was called to return to Criteria Studios to finish the track. Caillat built the solo by piecing together six different lead guitar takes. He accomplished this by pulling up individual guitar solos through faders, which he would mute after bringing up the next fader. Caillat found the solo "seamless" despite its fragmented nature. A Shure SM57 microphone was used to capture the guitar solo in addition to some vocal tracks.

In the final mix, the kick drum became too overpowering at the end of the song; it created a pumping effect together with the rhythm guitar from the dynamic range compression. Producer/engineer Richard Dashut argued that they would not have encountered this "lucky mistake" had they mixed the song digitally.

Lyrics
Like most tracks on Rumours, the lyrical content of "Go Your Own Way" documents personal strain in relationships between band members. Buckingham wrote "Go Your Own Way" as a response to his breakup with fellow Fleetwood Mac vocalist Stevie Nicks, whom he had known since he was 16 years old. "I was completely devastated when she took off," Buckingham noted. "And yet I had to make hits for her. I had to do a lot of things for her that I really didn't want to do. And yet I did them. So on one level I was a complete professional in rising above that, but there was a lot of pent-up frustration and anger towards Stevie in me for many years." Writing the song helped Buckingham come to terms with reality, despite his fallout with Nicks.

When Nicks heard the song, she demanded that Buckingham remove the line "Packing up, shacking up is all you wanna do", but he ultimately kept the lyrics. Nicks later explained her feelings about the line: "I very much resented him telling the world that 'packing up, shacking up' with different men was all I wanted to do," she told Rolling Stone. "He knew it wasn't true. It was just an angry thing that he said. Every time those words would come onstage, I wanted to go over and kill him. He knew it, so he really pushed my buttons through that. It was like, 'I'll make you suffer for leaving me.' And I did."

Release and initial response
Although the release date for Rumours was set for February 1977, Fleetwood Mac wanted a single out by Christmas 1976; "Go Your Own Way", which had just been mastered, was chosen to fulfill that role. This marketing move proved to be a boon to album sales: Pre-orders had reached 800,000 copies, which at the time was the largest advance sale in Warner Brothers' history.

B. Mitchel Reed, a Los Angeles radio deejay in the 1970s, was underwhelmed when he first played the single on his program. After the song had finished, he said "I don't know about that one" to his listeners. Later that day, Buckingham contacted Reed, demanding to know what the problem was. Reed informed Buckingham that he had a difficult time finding beat one of the song. Buckingham attributed the problem to the acoustic guitar track he added late into production. While he maintained that the acoustic guitar glued the whole piece together, its unusual entrance created confusion over the location of beat one. "As soon as I came up with the acoustic part, the whole song came to life for me because it acted as a foil for the vocals and a rhythmic counterpoint…so when it comes in, you don't have a reference point for where the 'one' is, or where the beat is at all. It's only after the first chorus comes in that you can realize where you are – and that's what that deejay was confused about."

Fleetwood, on the other hand, blamed his drumming but defended his playing as "capitalizing on (his) own ineptness". Since then, Fleetwood has declared "Go Your Own Way" as one of his favorite songs to play, and praised Buckingham's contributions to the track. Jeff Porcaro, the drummer for Boz Scaggs, as well as a founding member of Toto, was particularly impressed with Fleetwood's drumming on "Go Your Own Way". On nights when Boz Scaggs opened for Fleetwood Mac during their tour, Porcaro would watch Fleetwood from the side of the stage. Intrigued by his unorthodox playing, Porcaro approached Fleetwood after a live gig:

I've watched, I've tried to understand it. Nothing you do up there makes sense, but it sounds beautiful. What's your method? What are you doing in that last fill of "Go Your Own Way"? I can't figure it out! I've been watching every night. What do you do in the last measure on that last beat? Is the snare ahead or behind? Fleetwood explained to Porcaro that his dyslexia prevented him from understanding the minutiae of his drumming. Fleetwood said of that conversation, "It was only after we continued to talk that Jeff realized I wasn't kidding around. We eventually had a tremendous laugh about it..."

Critical reception
"Go Your Own Way" has achieved critical acclaim in retrospective reviews. Noting the song's resurgence in popularity with millennials, James Lachno marvels at the song's appeal with younger people, especially when juxtaposed with its alternative contemporaries. "Recently, Go Your Own Way and The Chain – better known as the BBC's Formula One theme tune – have become 2am favourites for bleary-eyed twentysomethings desperate to keep a house party going. By contrast, pioneering punk hits released in the same year such as God Save the Queen and White Riot never seem to get a look in." Daryl Easlea of BBC described Buckingham's compositions as the best tracks on Rumours, "Go Your Own Way" included. In a review of the Rumours Deluxe Edition, Steven Rosen praised Buckingham's acoustic guitar strumming and raw vocal delivery, all of which keeps the listener "riveted". Matthew Greenwald of AllMusic noted the song's folky sound, reminiscent of pre-Beatles bands like The Everly Brothers. Greenwald also praised the lively chord changes and bombastic choruses. "All of these factors, plus a great performance from the band (especially Buckingham's exquisite guitar solo) helped make the song one of the band's biggest and most timeless hits, ever." Billboard felt the song sounded somewhat like Jefferson Starship.

"Go Your Own Way" was ranked number 120 by Rolling Stone magazine on their list of 500 greatest songs of all time in 2010, and re-ranked number 401 in 2021. It is on the Rock and Roll Hall of Fame's 500 Songs that Shaped Rock and Roll list. Rolling Stone also ranked it No. 1 on its list of Fleetwood Mac's 50 Greatest Songs. In 2012, "Go Your Own Way" was listed by music magazine NME in 33rd place on its list of "50 Most Explosive Choruses."

"Go Your Own Way" was nominated for the Grammy Award for Best Vocal Arrangement in 1978, but lost to "New Kid in Town" by the Eagles.

Commercial performance
Like their last three singles from the album Fleetwood Mac, "Go Your Own Way" became a hit in the US. The track made its first appearance on the Billboard Hot 100 chart dated January 8, 1977, where it entered at No. 71. Two weeks later, the single ascended into the top 40. On March 12, 1977, the song reached its peak of No. 10, a position it held for two weeks. The song spent a total of 11 weeks in the top 40. In Fred Bronson's Billboard's Hottest Hot 100 Hits, a book that lists the top 5000 most successful songs released between July 9, 1955, and February 3, 2007 in terms of chart performance, "Go Your Own Way" ranks 4201st.

In the UK, the single was not as successful, only reaching No. 38 with an initial chart run of four weeks. However, the song was popular in the UK over a longer period as Rumours received more radio airplay, and it re-entered the singles chart as a digital download on several occasions, beginning in 2009, eventually accumulating eight additional weeks on the UK chart. In April 2022, the song was certified triple platinum by the British Phonographic Industry (BPI), denoting sales and streams of over 1,800,000 units.

In New Zealand, the single debuted at No. 40 on March 13, 1977. Two weeks later, it broke into the top 30. The song remained at No. 30 for two weeks on the chart dated April 10 and 17. By April 24, "Go Your Own Way" reached its peak of No. 23. While "Go Your Own Way" fell off the chart by May 29, it re-entered the following week at No. 38, extending its total chart duration to 11 weeks.

Track listing
US vinyl (Warner Brothers Records – WBS 8304)
"Go Your Own Way" – 3:34
"Silver Springs" – 4:33

Personnel
Lindsey Buckingham – electric guitars, 12-string acoustic guitar, lead vocals, backing vocals
Stevie Nicks – backing vocals
Christine McVie – Hammond organ, backing vocals
John McVie – bass guitar
Mick Fleetwood – drums, maracas, cymbals

Charts

Weekly charts

Year-end charts

Certifications

Live performances and other appearances
"Go Your Own Way" has been played on every Fleetwood Mac tour since the Rumours Tour. Three years after its first appearance on Rumours, a live recording was included on Live. This was from a 1979 show in Cleveland, and featured Buckingham's guitar tech, Ray Lindsey, on rhythm guitar. Even after Buckingham left the group in 1987, the band continued to play "Go Your Own Way" in concert. One of Buckingham's replacements, Billy Burnette, singled out "Go Your Own Way" as his favorite song to play on the Shake the Cage Tour. On the final two nights of the 1990 Behind the Mask Tour, Buckingham joined the band onstage to perform "Go Your Own Way". The 1994–95 lineup of Fleetwood Mac, which included former Traffic guitarist Dave Mason, also included the song in their main setlist.

For The Dance tour, "Go Your Own Way" served as the main set closer, and Buckingham and Nicks "hammed" up the performance by exchanging glances and holding hands as they walked back on stage. Buckingham admitted that these gestures were not genuine, and was only "playing it out" with Nicks for the audience. "Silver Springs", previously relegated to the B-side of "Go Your Own Way", appeared alongside the latter on the 1997 live album, The Dance. Both songs would make it onto the DVD and CD of Fleetwood Mac: Live in Boston, filmed from their Say You Will Tour in 2003. On An Evening with Fleetwood Mac, Buckingham's replacements Mike Campbell and Neil Finn shared guitar duties, while the latter also doubled up on lead vocals.

Throughout the years, "Go Your Own Way" has made its way onto numerous compilations, including Greatest Hits in 1988, 25 Years – The Chain in 1992, The Very Best of Fleetwood Mac in 2002, Opus Collection in 2013, and 50 Years – Don't Stop in 2018.

Go Your Own Way has also been used as a song for the ad campaign for Isuzu Utes in Australia since 2019 to boost sales for the Isuzu MU-X and Isuzu D-Max in that market.

Other versions
Wilson Phillips recorded a cover of "Go Your Own Way" for their 2004 reunion cover songs album California. The song peaked at number 13 on the Billboard Adult Contemporary chart. In New Zealand, "Go Your Own Way" topped the country's adult contemporary radio chart for several weeks.

In 2011, Lea Michele of the American musical comedy drama Glee sang the song on season two's "Rumours" episode. This cover would go on to peak at No. 51 in the UK.

A year later, in 2012, the American singer-songwriter Lissie also charted with her cover. This rendition was included on the Nicholas Sparks movie soundtrack for Safe Haven.

In 2022, Ben Platt and Aly & AJ performed the song on the former's Reverie Tour and during the Disneyland portions on the 2023 edition of Dick Clark's New Year's Rockin' Eve.

References

External links
CLASSIC TRACKS: Fleetwood Mac 'Go Your Own Way'
VIDEO: Go Your Own Way by Fleetwood Mac 
Fleetwood Mac's Go Your Own Way on Last.fm

1976 songs
1977 singles
Songs written by Lindsey Buckingham
Song recordings produced by Ken Caillat
Song recordings produced by Richard Dashut
Warner Records singles
Aly & AJ songs
Ben Platt songs
Biffy Clyro songs
Carrie Underwood songs
Colbie Caillat songs
The Cranberries songs
Fleetwood Mac songs
Keane (band) songs
The Lumineers songs
NOFX songs
Silverstein (band) songs
Wilson Phillips songs